Bongao, officially the Municipality of Bongao,  is a 2nd class municipality and capital of the province of Tawi-Tawi, Philippines. According to the 2020 census, it has a population of 116,118 people.

History

Evidence of human presence in Bongao was carbon-dated to be 8,810 to 5,190 years old, signifying one of the earliest known evidence of human presence in Southeast Asia. The bones, jars, shells, and other artifacts and fossils were found in the Bolobok Rock Shelter Cave Archaeological Site, which has been declared as an Important Cultural Treasure by the government in 2017.

Much of the Bongao area was the center of Bajau culture and arts for hundreds of years. By the 14th century, Muslim missionaries from Arabia arrived and established the first ever mosque in the Philippines. The area was heavily converted to Islam, especially when the Sultanate of Sulu in nearby Sulu province was founded.

The province of Tawi-tawi was never officially controlled directly by the Spanish as the Sultanate of Sulu was in a perpetual war with Spain, resulting to the preservation of its Muslim and Bajau cultures. However, the sultanate waned and was captured by Spain, only to be handed to American forces after a few years. Sibutu remained under Spanish rule until 1900.

Before the armed rebellion of the MNLF in the early 1970s, Bongao was merely a backwater village ruled by the prominent noble Halun family, who used to own about three-quarters of the island. The capital of the province was Batu-Batu (in Panglima Sugala) in the mainland situated in a cove with deep waters suited for anchors of the Philippine Navy. At the height of the armed rebellion and fearing that the provincial capitol might be overrun, the government transferred it to Bongao. The white-washed, Taj Mahal-inspired provincial capitol building is located on a hill overlooking the bay and the whole town to the North of the Island against the backdrop of Mount Kabugan and the famous Bud Bongao (Bongao Peak).

The transfer of the seat of government ushered the rapid development of the island as the southernmost center of commerce and trade. Suddenly, the population swelled as individuals (and their families) who are in government service moved to the town.

Geography
The municipality's territory includes Bongao Island (where the poblacion is located), Sanga-Sanga Island, Pababag Island, as well as the western end of Tawi-Tawi Island.

Barangays
Bongao is politically subdivided into 35 barangays, themselves split into two geographical regions: Mainland and Islands.

 Ipil - M
 Kamagong - M
 Karungdong- I
 Lakit Lakit- I
 Lamion- I
 Lapid Lapid - M
 Lato Lato- I
 Luuk Pandan - I
 Luuk Tulay - M
 Malassa- I
 Mandulan- I
 Masantong - M
 Montay Montay - M
 Pababag - I
 Pagasinan - I
 Pahut- I
 Pakias- I
 Paniongan- I
 Pasiagan - I
 Bongao Poblacion- I
 Sanga-Sanga- I
 Silubog - M
 Simandagit- I
 Sumangat - M
 Tarawakan - M
 Tongsinah- I
 Tubig Basag- I
 Ungus-ungus - M
 Lagasan- I
 Nalil- I
 Pagatpat - M
 Pag-asa - I
 Tubig Tanah- I
 Tubig-Boh- I
 Tubig-Mampallam- I

Climate
Bongao has a tropical rainforest climate (Af) with heavy rainfall year-round.

Demographics

Culture
Today, Bongao is a minuscule cosmopolitan site that is becoming a model of multicultural society. In downtown Bongao, there are mosques for the majority Muslim population, a Catholic church, a church for Protestant inhabitants, and a Chinese temple.

The municipality is the home of the Balobok Rock Shelter-Cave Archaeological Site, which carbon dates the existence of humans on Tawi-Tawi for 5,000-8,000 years, making it one of the earliest human settlement site in Southeast Asia. The entire archaeological site has been declared as an Important Cultural Property by the National Government in 2017.

Economy 

The main thoroughfare is Datu Halun Street, where the Town Hall is situated. Poblacion is the commercial hub. Most of the businesses here are owned by local people. Due to its relative peace and order situation, recent migrant Chinese from Zamboanga have also open business.

Banks operating in Bongao include Land Bank of the Philippines, Philippine National Bank, and Metrobank. Quedancor, a government owned investment company, has recently opened business.

The Midway Plaza Mall, a new 2-storey retail center, is the first shopping mall in Tawi-tawi opened in April 2010.

Education
Bongao is home to the Mindanao State University - Tawi-Tawi College of Technology and Oceanography (MSU-TCTO), Tawi-Tawi Regional Agricultural College (TRAC), Mahardika Institute of Technology (MIT), Abubakar Learning Center Foundation College (ALC), Tawi-Tawi School of Midwifery (TTSM). The first two are government owned state colleges, while the last three are privately owned.

There are several secondary high schools in Tawi-Tawi such as the MSU TCTO - Science High School, MSU TCTO Preparatory High School, Tawi-Tawi School of Arts and Trade, Notre Dame of Bongao, and Tawi-Tawi School of Fisheries (TTSF).

References

External links

Bongao Profile at PhilAtlas.com
[ Philippine Standard Geographic Code]
Bongao Profile at the DTI Cities and Municipalities Competitive Index
Philippine Census Information

Municipalities of Tawi-Tawi
Provincial capitals of the Philippines